The Bliss-Leavitt Mark 1 torpedo was a Bliss-Leavitt torpedo adopted by the United States Navy for use in an anti-surface ship role after the E. W. Bliss Company of Brooklyn, New York, which had been building Whitehead torpedoes for the US Navy, began designing and manufacturing their own torpedoes in 1904.

Characteristics
However, it used a single vertical turbine wheel rotating about the torpedo's longitudinal axis and driving a single propeller. This caused an unbalanced torque that was sufficient to cause the Mark 1 to have a tendency to roll.

The Bliss-Leavitt Mark 1 was launched from battleships, torpedo boats and cruisers.

See also
American 21 inch torpedo

References

Torpedoes
Torpedoes of the United States
Unmanned underwater vehicles
Bliss-Leavitt torpedoes